Homaemus is a genus of shield-backed bugs in the family Scutelleridae. There are about 5 described species in Homaemus.

Species
 Homaemus aeneifrons (Say, 1824)
 Homaemus bijugis Uhler, 1872
 Homaemus parvulus (Germar, 1839)
 Homaemus proteus Stål, 1862
 Homaemus variegatus Van Duzee, 1914

References

Further reading

 
 
 

Scutelleridae
Pentatomomorpha genera